WRRD (89.9 FM) is a radio station licensed to Greensboro, Georgia. The station is part of the Rejoice Radio network owned by Pensacola Christian College.

Formerly easy listening WEEZ, original owner Community Public Radio sold WEEZ and its associated translator in Milledgeville to Pensacola Christian College effective April 23, 2021 for $142,500. The station changed its call sign to WRRD on April 26.

Translators

References

External links

RRD (FM)
Radio stations established in 2011
2011 establishments in Georgia (U.S. state)